Alysicarpus is a genus of flowering plants in the legume family, Fabaceae. It is distributed in tropical and subtropical regions of Africa, Asia and Australia. Species are known generally as moneyworts. Unusually for legumes, the leaves are simple (not compound).

Species

, Plants of the World Online recognised the following species:
Alysicarpus aurantiacus 
Alysicarpus belgaumensis 
Alysicarpus bracteus 
Alysicarpus brownii 
Alysicarpus bupleurifolius  – sweet alys
Alysicarpus ferrugineus 
Alysicarpus gamblei 
Alysicarpus gautalensis 
Alysicarpus glumaceus 
Alysicarpus hamosus 
Alysicarpus hendersonii 
Alysicarpus heterophyllus 
Alysicarpus heyneanus 
Alysicarpus longifolius 
Alysicarpus luteovexillatus 
Alysicarpus major 
Alysicarpus misquittae 
Alysicarpus monilifer 
Alysicarpus muelleri 
Alysicarpus naikianus 
Alysicarpus ovalifolius  – alyce clover
Alysicarpus parviflorus 
Alysicarpus pokleanus 
Alysicarpus prainii 
Alysicarpus pubescens 
Alysicarpus quartinianus 
Alysicarpus racemosus 
Alysicarpus roxburghianus 
Alysicarpus rugosus  – red moneywort
Alysicarpus rupicola 
Alysicarpus salim-alii 
Alysicarpus sanjappae 
Alysicarpus saplianus 
Alysicarpus scariosus 
Alysicarpus schomburgkii 
Alysicarpus sedgwickii 
Alysicarpus suffruticosus 
Alysicarpus tetragonolobus 
Alysicarpus vaginalis  – white moneywort, buffalo clover, one-leaf clover
Alysicarpus yunnanensis 
Alysicarpus zeyheri

References 

 
Fabaceae genera